Ben McCulloch (born 26 March 1982) is an Australian former professional boxer who competed from 2008 to 2014. He held the PABA super-middleweight title from 2012 to 2014 and challenged for the WBA interim title in 2014.

Professional career 

McCulloch won the IBF Pan Pacific and vacant PABA super-middleweight titles in October 2012 by defeating Les Piper. He retained the PABA title against Jonatan Simamora and Yodkhunsuk Mor Poowana. McCulloch then challenged Fedor Chudinov for the WBA interim title in December 2014, but was defeated via second-round knockout.

Professional boxing record 

{|class="wikitable" style="text-align:center"
|-
!
!Result
!Record
!Opponent
!Type
!Round, time
!Date
!Location
!Notes
|-
|15
|Loss
|14–1
|style="text-align:left;"| Fedor Chudinov
|KO
|2 (12), 
|11 Dec 2014
|style="text-align:left;"| 
|style="text-align:left;"|
|-
|14
|Win
|14–0
|style="text-align:left;"| Yodkhunsuk Mor Poowana
|TKO
|4 (12), 
|2 Aug 2014
|style="text-align:left;"| 
|style="text-align:left;"|
|-
|13
|Win
|13–0
|style="text-align:left;"| Gavad Zohrehvand
|TKO
|3 (6), 
|7 Feb 2014
|style="text-align:left;"| 
|
|-
|12
|Win
|12–0
|style="text-align:left;"| Jonatan Simamora
|KO
|6 (12), 
|17 Aug 2013
|style="text-align:left;"| 
|style="text-align:left;"|
|-
|11
|Win
|11–0
|style="text-align:left;"| Les Piper
|KO
|9 (12), 
|24 Oct 2012
|style="text-align:left;"| 
|style="text-align:left;"|
|-
|10
|Win
|10–0
|style="text-align:left;"| Amir Ranjdar
|TKO
|1 (6), 
|10 Aug 2012
|style="text-align:left;"| 
|
|-
|9
|Win
|9–0
|style="text-align:left;"| Eddie Lenart
|TKO
|1 (4), 
|22 Jun 2012
|style="text-align:left;"| 
|
|-
|8
|Win
|8–0
|style="text-align:left;"| Atalili Fai
|KO
|2 (6), 
|19 Feb 2012
|style="text-align:left;"| 
|
|-
|7
|Win
|7–0
|style="text-align:left;"| Marlon Toby
|TKO
|2 (6), 
|25 Nov 2011
|style="text-align:left;"| 
|
|-
|6
|Win
|6–0
|style="text-align:left;"| Mark Flanagan
|
|6
|15 Apr 2011
|style="text-align:left;"| 
|
|-
|5
|Win
|5–0
|style="text-align:left;"| Omar Shaick
|
|6
|10 Jun 2010
|style="text-align:left;"| 
|
|-
|4
|Win
|4–0
|style="text-align:left;"| Shawn Martin
|
|1 (4), 
|17 Apr 2010
|style="text-align:left;"| 
|
|-
|3
|Win
|3–0
|style="text-align:left;"| Brian Matchett
|
|6
|6 Mar 2009
|style="text-align:left;"| 
|
|-
|2
|Win
|2–0
|style="text-align:left;"| Paz Viejo
|TKO
|4 (4), 
|7 Feb 2009
|style="text-align:left;"| 
|
|-
|1
|Win
|1–0
|style="text-align:left;"|Timophy Nasoa
|
|1 (4), 
|27 Aug 2008
|style="text-align:left;"| 
|

External links

1982 births
Living people
Australian male boxers
Boxers from Sydney
Super-middleweight boxers
Sportsmen from New South Wales